In argumentation, an objection is a reason arguing against a premise, argument, or conclusion. Definitions of objection vary in whether an objection is always an argument (or counterargument) or may include other moves such as questioning. 

An objection to an objection is sometimes known as a rebuttal.

An objection can be issued against an argument retroactively from the point of reference of that argument. This form of objection – invented by the presocratic philosopher Parmenides – is commonly referred to as a retroactive refutation.

Inference objection
An inference objection is an objection to an argument based not on any of its stated premises, but rather on the relationship between a premise and main contention. For a given simple argument, if the assumption is made that its premises are correct, fault may be found in the progression from these to the conclusion of the argument. This can often take the form of an unstated co-premise, as in begging the question. In other words, it may be necessary to make an assumption in order to conclude anything from a set of true statements. This assumption must also be true in order that the conclusion follow logically from the initial statements.

Example 

In the example to the left, the objector can't find anything contentious in the stated premises of the argument supporting the conclusion that "There is no danger in NASA's Stardust Mission bringing material from the Wild 2 comet back to Earth", but still disagrees with the conclusion. The objection is therefore placed beside the main premise and exactly corresponds to an unstated or 'hidden' co-premise. This is demonstrated by the argument map to the right in which the full pattern of reasoning relating to the contention is set out.

See also

 Argument map
 Defeater

References

Arguments
Statements